Mariusz Fyrstenberg and Santiago González were the defending champions and successfully defended the title, defeating Steve Johnson and Sam Querrey, in the final 6–4, 6–4.

Seeds

Draw

Draw

References
 Main Draw

Memphis Open - Doubles
2016 Men's Doubles